Echo Heart was released on 19 December 2006, and is Markus Fagervall's debut studio album.

Track listing
 All The Way
 How Come You're The One
 Close My Eyes
 Everything Changes
 Something Real
 For Once
 Indian Sky
 Heartstopper (You Got Me Started)
 The Best Of What I Got
 Hole In The Sky
 Only You (Young And True)

Contributors
Markus Fagervall - singer
Fredrik Thomander - bass
Peter Månsson - drums
Anders Wikström - guitar
Jocke Svalberg - keyboard

Charts

Weekly charts

Year-end charts

References

2006 debut albums
Markus Fagervall albums